Harmening's High Flyers was an American aircraft manufacturer founded by Mike Harmening. It was originally based in Genoa, Illinois and later in Big Stone City, South Dakota. The company specialized in the design and manufacture of powered parachutes in the form of kits for amateur construction and ready-to-fly aircraft in the US FAR 103 Ultralight Vehicles rules.

The company was founded in 1988 and seems to have gone out of business in 2008.

Harmening's produced a whole range of powered parachutes including the base model High Flyer, Standard, Deluxe, Premiere, Executive and the High Five, all variants of the same basic design.

Aircraft

References

External links
Company website archives on Archive.org

Defunct aircraft manufacturers of the United States
Ultralight aircraft
Homebuilt aircraft
Powered parachutes